Vela or Velas may refer to:

Astronomy
 Vela (constellation), a constellation in the southern sky (the Sails)
 Vela (Chinese astronomy)
 Vela Pulsar
 Vela X-1, a pulsing, eclipsing high-mass X-ray binary system

Places
Vela Bluff, Antarctica
Vela, Dolj, Romania
Vela (Ilidža – Sarajevo), Bosnia and Herzegovina
Velas, Maharashtra, India

Ships
 CMA CGM Vela, a container ship in service since 2008
 USNS Vela (T-AK-89), US Army port repair ship
 Vela-class submarine, of the Indian Navy
 INS Vela (S40), in service 1973–2010

Technology
 Project Vela, a system developed by the United States to monitor compliance with the Partial Test Ban Treaty
 Vela (satellite), a series of satellites launched by the United States to monitor nuclear testing
 Vela incident, an international incident, in which a Vela satellite is thought to possibly have observed a nuclear test
 Versatile Laboratory Aid (VELA), a data logging tool used in education

People

Given name
 Vela Jiménez (fl. 882–883), Count of Álava
 Vela Ladrón (fl. 1136–1174), Spanish nobleman
 Vela Manusaute, Niuean writer and director
 Vela Ovéquiz (fl. 1065–1085), count in the Kingdom of Galicia
 Vela Peeva (1922–1944), Bulgarian partisan
 Vela Velupillai (born 1947), Sri Lankan-American economist

Surname
Alejandro Vela (born 1984), Mexican footballer
Alexandra Vela, Ecuadorian lawyer and politician
Arqueles Vela (1899–1977), Guatemalan-Mexican writer, journalist, and teacher
Blanca Vela (1936–2014), American politician
Blasco Núñez Vela (1490–1546), viceroy of Peru
Carlos Vela (born 1989), Mexican footballer
Carmen Vela (born 1955), Spanish entrepreneur, researcher, and cabinet minister
Cindy Vela (born 1979), American actress, model, and saxophonist
Cristóbal Vela (1588–1654), Spanish Baroque painter and gilder
Ernesto Vela (born 1968), Mexican Olympic swimmer
Filemon Vela, Jr. (born 1963), American lawyer and politician
Filemon Vela, Sr. (1935–2004), United States federal judge
Giuseppe Vela Júnior (born 1977), Brazilian footballer
Gonzalo Vázquez Vela (1893–1963), Mexican politician
José Manuel Vela Bargues (1962–2022), Spanish economist and politician
Josh Vela (born 1993), English footballer
Lucé Vela, First Lady of Puerto Rico from 2009 to 2013
Marco Alonso Vela (born 1961), Mexican politician
Moises Vela, American lawyer and government advisor
Nallely Vela (born 1986), Mexican sprinter
Norma Safford Vela, American television writer, director, and producer
Orlando Vela (born 1994), Mexican footballer
Rafael Cárdenas Vela, Mexican drug cartel leader
Ricky Vela, American songwriter and keyboardist
Rodolfo Neri Vela (born 1952), Mexican scientist and astronaut
Rosie Vela (born 1954), American model and singer-songwriter
Sergio Vela (born 1964), Mexican-American opera director
Spartaco Vela (1853–1895), Italian painter, son of Vincenzo Vela
Vincenzo Vela (1820–1891), Swiss-Italian sculptor

Other uses
 Nemmara Vallangi Vela, an annual festival of a village called Nemmara in South India
 Vela International Marine, a subsidiary of Saudi Aramco
 Vela, a playable character in the video game Jet Force Gemini
 Vela, a religious, cultural celebration from the city of Tehuantepec, Mexico
 Vela, an alternative appellation for Mokosh, the consort of the Slavic god of thunder
Vela (crab), a genus of land crabs in the family Gecarcinucidae

See also
Velas, Azores
Velada, Spain
Delta Velorum, and Velorum stars related